Anthony Alred Balsamo is a former Major League Baseball player. He was born November 21, 1937, in Brooklyn, New York. He went to Fordham University, where he pitched on the baseball team.

In 1959 he got his big break; the Chicago Cubs signed him as a free agent. He was called up by the Cubs on April 14, 1962. He pitched in 29.1 innings and recorded a 0–1 record with a 6.44 ERA. He only played in one big league season.

External links

1937 births
Living people
Major League Baseball pitchers
Chicago Cubs players
Sportspeople from Brooklyn
Baseball players from New York City
Fordham Rams baseball players
Erasmus Hall High School alumni
Burlington Bees players
Paris Lakers players
St. Cloud Rox players
San Antonio Missions players
Wenatchee Chiefs players